The Rioulan is a small river that flows through the Alpes-Maritimes department of southeastern France. It flows into the Estéron in Sigale.

References

Rivers of France
Rivers of Alpes-Maritimes
Rivers of Alpes-de-Haute-Provence
Rivers of Provence-Alpes-Côte d'Azur